Peter the Great, is a 1910 Russian short film directed by Vasili Goncharov and Kai Hansen.

Plot 
The film shows the main events in the life of Peter the Great.

Starring 
 Pyotr Voinov as Pyotr I, Peter the Great
 Ye. Trubetskaya as Yekaterina
 A. Gorbachevskiy as Boyar Latyshkin
 Vladimir Karin as Lakot
 A. Slavin as Boyar Poltev
 Ye. Talanova as Tsarina-mother
 Vander-Veide as Princess Sofya
 A. Veskov

References

External links 
 

1910 films
1910s Russian-language films
Russian silent short films
1910 short films
Russian black-and-white films
Films directed by Vasily Goncharov
Films directed by Kai Hansen
Films of the Russian Empire